Michael Augustine Owen Lewis (born 8 June 1953) is an Anglican archbishop, born in England and now serving in the Middle East. He is the Anglican Bishop in Cyprus and the Gulf in the Episcopal Church in Jerusalem and the Middle East. Within his diocese lie Cyprus, Iraq, and the whole of the Arabian Peninsula including the Arab states of the Persian Gulf. He is also President Bishop and Primate of the Province of Jerusalem and the Middle East with the title of Archbishop, since 17 November 2019.

Early life and education
Lewis was born on 8 June 1953. He was educated at King Edward VI School, Southampton and Merton College, Oxford, where he read Oriental Studies (Hebrew, Aramaic, and Syriac) taking a BA in 1974 and MA in 1979. He was formed for the priesthood at Cuddesdon Theological College, taking his second Oxford degree in the Final Honour School of Theology in 1977.

Ordained ministry
Lewis was ordained deacon in 1978 and priest in 1979. After a curacy at Christ the King, Salfords, Surrey, in the Diocese of Southwark he became Chaplain of Thames Polytechnic in 1980. He was Vicar of St Mary the Virgin, Welling, Southwark from 1984 to 1991 when he became Team Rector of Worcester South East and later Rural Dean of Worcester and Canon of Worcester Cathedral.

Consecration to the episcopate followed in 1999 when he was appointed to the suffragan bishopric of Middleton. In 2007 he was translated to Cyprus and the Gulf

On 5 June 2011, he ordained the first female priest in the Middle East in Saint Christopher's Cathedral, Manama.

He is a member of the International Commission for Anglican-Orthodox Theological Dialogue, and previously of the Anglican Consultative Council, as well as a consultant to the Inter-Anglican Standing Commission on Unity, Faith, and Order, and Bishop-Visitor of the Community of the Sisters of the Love of God, Convent of the Incarnation, Fairacres, Oxford.  Since 2021 he has been a Honorary Fellow of Merton College, Oxford.

He took office as president bishop of the Episcopal Church in Jerusalem and the Middle East on 17 November 2019, in a ceremony held at St. Andrew Church, in Abu Dhabi, United Arab Emirates. He is scheduled to retire as president bishop on 12 May 2023 (to be succeeded by Hosam Naoum), and as diocesan bishop on 8 June 2023.

References

1952 births
Living people
People educated at King Edward VI School, Southampton
Alumni of Merton College, Oxford
Bishops of Middleton
Anglican bishops in Cyprus and the Gulf
21st-century Church of England bishops
21st-century Anglican bishops in the Middle East
Fellows of Merton College, Oxford